Mentissa is a genus of gastropods belonging to the family Clausiliidae.

The species of this genus are found in Mediterranean and near Black Sea.

Species:

Mentissa canalifera 
Mentissa gracilicosta 
Mentissa velutina

References

Clausiliidae